Schöftland Nordweg railway station is a railway station in the municipality of Schöftland, in the Swiss canton of Aargau. It is the penultimate station at the western end of the  gauge Schöftland–Aarau–Menziken line of Aargau Verkehr.

Services
The following services serve Schöftland:

References 

Railway stations in the canton of Aargau
Aargau Verkehr stations